Fabrizio Cornegliani (born 12 March 1969) is an Italian Para-cyclist who represented Italy at the 2020 Summer Paralympics.

Career
Cornegliani represented Italy in the men's road time trial H1 event at the 2020 Summer Paralympics and won a silver medal.

References

External links
 

Living people
1969 births
Italian male cyclists
Cyclists at the 2020 Summer Paralympics
Medalists at the 2020 Summer Paralympics
Paralympic medalists in cycling
Paralympic silver medalists for Italy
20th-century Italian people
21st-century Italian people